General elections were held in Tuvalu on 27 September 1989. Bikenibeu Paeniu was elected Prime Minister following the elections and formed a five-member cabinet composed largely of opponents of the previous Prime Minister Tomasi Puapua.

Campaign
As there were no political parties, all candidates for the twelve seats ran as independents. The Nui constituency was contested by four members of the same family. Bikenibeu Paeniu was the only candidate in Nukulaelae and was elected unopposed.

Results
For the first time, a woman was elected, with Naama Maheu Latasi winning one of the seats on Nanumea. Her husband Kamuta Latasi was elected in Funafuti. In Nui Minister for Commerce and Natural Resources Lale Seluka was defeated by his brother Alesana Seluka.

Elected members

Aftermath
Following the elections Kokea Malua was elected Speaker and Bikenibeu Paeniu elected Prime Minister. Paeniu subsequently formed a five-member cabinet, keeping the Foreign Affairs and Economic Planning portfolios for himself. Alesana Seluka became Deputy Prime Minister and Minister of Finance and Commerce, Naama Maheu Latasi was appointed Minister of Health, Education and Community Affairs, Ionatana Ionatana as Minister of Works and Communications and Tomu Sione as Minister of Natural Resources and Home Affairs.

References

Tuvalu
Elections in Tuvalu
Election
Non-partisan elections
Election and referendum articles with incomplete results